Emmanuelle Mignon (born 26 April 1968) served as cabinet secretary for French president Nicolas Sarkozy between May 2007 and July 28, 2008.

Mignon studied at the Saint Mary's College in Neuilly, near Paris, and at the Lycée Sainte-Geneviève in Versailles.

On 21 January 2022, Mignon and three co-defendants, former Sarkozy chief of staff Claude Gueant, writer and one-time Sarkozy advisor Patrick Buisson and former pollster and consultant Pierre Giacometti. were found guilty of polling fraud involving allegations that they misused public money while ordering public opinion polls worth a combined 7.5 million euros ($8.7 million) during the course of Sarkozy's presidency, though Mignon would receive no jail time and was given a six month suspended sentence.

References

1968 births
Living people
Civil servants from Paris
ESSEC Business School alumni
Sciences Po alumni
École nationale d'administration alumni
Female heads of state